Sergey Olegovich Kuznetsov (born 25 July 1977, Moscow) is a Russian architect, Chief Architect of Moscow  (since 21 August 2012).

Biography

 1977 — born in Moscow, Russia.
 1984–1994 — study in secondary school № 329.
 1995–2001 — study in Moscow Architectural Institute, Department of Residential and Public Buildings, Diploma in Architecture.
 2000 — partner and general director of architectural studio “SLK-Proekt”.
 2003 — partner and general director of architectural studio “S.P.Proekt”.
 2006 — bureau “S.P.Proekt” entered the association “SPEECH Tchoban & Kuznetsov”.
 from 2006 to 2012[1] — managing partner of the architectural association «SPEECH Tchoban & Kuznetsov” in Moscow.
 2008 — co-founder of the architectural magazine speech:, together with Sergei Tchoban.
 2010 — participant of the project “Russia Factory” for the exhibition of the Russian pavilion at the 12th Venice Architecture Biennale.
 2012 — co-curator of the exhibition i-city/i-land Skolkovo project of the Russian pavilion at the 13th Venice Architecture Biennale. The pavilion was awarded a Special Mention.
 2012 — appointed Chief Architect of Moscow – First Deputy Chairman of Committee for Architecture and Urban Planning of Moscow
 2013 — appointed Chairman of the Architectural Council of Moscow
 2014 — appointed Chairman of the Town Planning Board of the Skolkovo Foundation.
 2014 — Honorary Professor of Moscow Architectural Institute (MARCHI).

Work as the Chief Architect of Moscow
By decree of the Mayor of Moscow № 681-RM on 20 August 2012 Sergey Kuznetsov was appointed as the Chief Architect of Moscow, the First Deputy Chairman of the Committee for Architecture and Urban Planning of Moscow.

During Kuznetsov’s first year in office, over 20 competitions in urban planning projects were held, including several major international competitions that included the design of Zaryadye Park and the National Centre for Contemporary Arts (NCCA). Working closely with Moscow Mayor Sobyanin and the Moscow Government, on the initiative of Sergey Kuznetsov competitions have become regular practice in Moscow as an effective method of urban planning.

Kuznetsov is also the Chairman of the Architectural Council of Moscow – a standing collegial consultative body to the Moscow City Committee for Architecture and Urban Planning. The Council’s work is aimed at making the decisions on key urban projects widely open to the public.

Quotes
 “It’s not the architects that create cities and architecture; it’s the citizens, irrespective of the government model.”
 “Moscow has a great potential. It is a rich and successful city. And it’s our job to channel this energy positively.”
 “Moscow must become a city in the full sense of the word. A city is a lifestyle. You live in a house that should be different from other houses: Your house should have a pleasant yard; your street should provide opportunities to go to a café, a restaurant, a corner store, or to socialize in any other way.”
 “It is impossible for us to become a warmer city, but we can become more attractive and hospitable.”
 “A chance to hold a competition and realize a project at a site as important for Moscow as Zaryadye is a once in a lifetime opportunity. I am happy because of the firm attitude of Moscow Mayor Sergey Sobyanin international competitions are becoming a common practice for Moscow, and through them we choose really great projects that when realized could achieve the world-best level. This is the only way for Moscow to join the ranks of world architecture capitals. Quote about the city for the people, public spaces, etc.”

Selected projects

 Granatniy 6 residential complex, Moscow, Russia, 2007-2010
 Office Building on Leninsky, Moscow, Russia, 2007-2011
 Palace of Water Sports, Kazan, Russia, 2008-2012
 Aquamarine III Business Centre. Moscow
 Museum for Architectural Drawing, Berlin, Germany, 2009-2013 
 Housing estate “V lesu” on Pyatnitskoye highway, Moscow, 2008 - up to present time
 Complex of buildings for media accommodation during 2014 Olympics, Sochi, Russia, 2010-2012
 Zaryadye information pavilion, Moscow, Russia, 2014

Exhibitions
 2006 — ARCH Moscow in Moscow, Russia
 2008 — MIPIM in Cannes, France
 2010 — “Factory Russia” at the XII Architectural Biennale in Venice, Italy
 2012 — The Architect’s Eye in Milan, Italy
 2012 — i-city/i-land in Venice, Italy
 2013 — Golden River at Cortile d’Onore in Italy
 2014 — “New Moscow – Новая Москва” at Aedes Gallery in Berlin, Germany
 2014 — U_cloud in Milan, France
 2014 — MOSKVA: urban space. Collateral Event of the 14th International Architecture Exhibition – la Biennale di Venezia
 2014 — All About Italy! Architectural Graphics of the XVIII — XXI Centuries at Tretyakov Gallery in Moscow, Russia

References

External links
  What it takes for Moscow to become a ‘real city’
 New Chief Architect Well-Grounded in History
 Sergey Kuznetsov, Chief Architect of Moscow: There are no cities in Europe similar to Moscow
 INTERVIEW WITH SERGEY KUZNETSOV, MOSCOW CHIEF ARCHITECT
 Sergey Kuznetsov, Chief Architect of Moscow: There are no cities in Europe similar to Moscow
 New blood for new challenges
 Biography at the website of the Mayor and the Government of Moscow
 The Calvert Journal: ‘Constructivism 2.0’: chief Moscow architect pledges to protect Soviet style
 Interview to THE PLAN Magazine

Architects from Moscow
1977 births
Living people